Bijapur is a city in the Indian state of Karnataka.

Bijapur may also refer to :

 Bijapur Sultanate under the Adil Shahi dynasty (1490-1687)
 Bijapur Subah, a Mughal imperial province

Places

Karnataka 
Bijapur Airport
Bijapur railway station
Bijapur district, Karnataka, a district in the state of Karnataka
Bijapur Taluka one of the five administrative subdivisions, of Bijapur District
Bijapur City (Vidhana Sabha constituency), the current legislative assembly constituency centered around the taluka
Bijapur (Vidhana Sabha constituency), the defunct assembly constituency of Karnataka
Bijapur (Lok Sabha constituency), a Lok Sabha constituency in comprising Bijapur district

 Elsewhere in India
 Bijapur district, Chhattisgarh, a district in Chhattisgarh state
Bijapur, Chhattisgarh, a town in the Bijapur district of Chhattisgarh
Bijapur (Chhattisgarh) (Vidhan Sabha constituency), the legislative assembly constituency centered around the town
 Bijapur, Rajasthan, a town in Pali district, Rajasthan

See also 

 Vijaypur (disambiguation)

ka:ბიჯაპური (მრავალმნიშვნელოვანი)
ru:Биджапур